Ephysteris ornata is a moth in the family Gelechiidae. It was described by Anthonie Johannes Theodorus Janse in 1950. It is found in Namibia and the South African province of Gauteng.

The larvae feed on Osteospermum muricatum.

References

Ephysteris
Moths described in 1950